Bishal Shrestha (born 12 September 1992) is a Nepalese professional footballer who plays as a goalkeeper for Machhindra F.C. and the Nepal national football team. Despite being member of Nepal national team since 2011, he got chance to debut in 2021 against India.

References

External links
 

1992 births
Living people
Nepalese footballers
Association football goalkeepers
Machhindra F.C. players